= Wilkes University, Mesa =

Private university in Mesa, Arizona, US

Coordinates: 33.419459°N 111.838163°W

- Motto: "Unity Amidst Diversity"
- Type: Private
- Active: 2013–2017
- President: Alan Gregory Cant, PhD
- Provost: Terese Wignot, PhD (interim)
- Undergraduates: 2,200
- Postgraduates: 2,700
- Location: Mesa, Arizona, United States of America
- Colors: Blue and Gold
- Mascot: Colonels
- Website: www.wilkes.edu/mesa

Wilkes University, Mesa was a campus of Wilkes University located in Mesa, Arizona. It began offering classes in Arizona in 2013. The university was established to provide first-generation college students access to higher education. It was one of four colleges invited to participate in Mesa's H.E.A.T. (Healthcare, Education, Aerospace, Technology/Tourism) Initiative for Economic Development. The campus ceased to offer in-person education in 2017.

In 1933, the Wilkes University main campus was founded in Wilkes-Barre, Pennsylvania. The university signed an agreement with Mesa, Arizona to bring a satellite location to the city in July 2012. Under the agreement, Mesa negotiated a five-year lease for Wilkes University in the Mesa Center for Higher Education.

Wilkes University, Mesa began offering classes in 2013. It was the fourth university to open a campus in Mesa that year. In 2013, the university began offering an MBA program. The main campus was ranked 74th best regional university in the northern United States by U.S. News & World Report the following year. In November 2014, Wilkes University, Mesa offered over $150,000 in scholarships to Mesa residents. The university focuses on providing education opportunities to first-generation students.

The university hosted a writer's conference and All-Collegiate poetry slam in December 2014. In January 2015, Wilkes University, Mesa began offering business majors including accounting, entrepreneurship, finance, management, marketing and sports and event management. Additionally, the university added master's degrees in creative writing and education to its degree plans as well as a doctor of education program in educational leadership. Wilkes University, Mesa graduated its first class of MBA students in December 2014.

== Academics ==
Wilkes University offered 39 undergraduate degree programs, a doctor of nursing practice, doctor of education and doctor of pharmacy degrees and multiple master's degrees. The Mesa location specialized in Master of Business Administration degrees and bachelor's degrees in business for transfer students. Additionally, the campus offered master's degrees in engineering management, creative writing, education and a doctor of education program.
